Richard West is an American politician, businessman, and retired law enforcement officer. He is a Republican member of the Missouri House of Representatives from the 63rd district which consists of parts of western St. Charles County and parts of eastern Warren County. In addition to being a Missouri legislator West is the mayor of New Melle, Missouri currently in his 4th term as of 2021.

When West was in law enforcement he served as a criminal investigator of 21 years, and served 28 months overseas working as an international police advisor in Iraq.

Education 
West graduated Bishop Du Bourg high school in 1985 and attended Western International University.

Electoral history

References 

21st-century American politicians
Republican Party members of the Missouri House of Representatives
Year of birth missing (living people)
Living people